The Anglican Church of St Margaret in Thorne St Margaret, Somerset, England was built in the 15th century. It is a Grade II* listed building.

History

The tower survives from the 15th century the rest of the church was subject to Victorian restoration undertaken in 1865 by Charles Edmund Giles, or Benjamin Ferrey. A west window, with stained glass was added in 1907.

The parish is part of the Wellington and District benefice within the Diocese of Bath and Wells.

Architecture

The red sandstone building with hamstone dressings has a slate roof. It consists of a three-bay nave, a three-bay aisle with a south porch and a two-bay chancel. The two-stage tower is supported by diagonal buttresses.

Inside the church is a chalice shaped Saxon font, which was reinstalled in the church after being found in the churchyard.

See also  
 List of ecclesiastical parishes in the Diocese of Bath and Wells

References

Grade II* listed buildings in Taunton Deane
Grade II* listed churches in Somerset